Keren Shlomo (born 14 January 1988 in Tel Aviv) is a retired Israeli tennis player.

Shlomo has won three singles and nine doubles titles on the ITF tour in her career. On 7 May 2012, she reached her best singles ranking of world number 359. On 18 June 2012, she peaked at world number 341 in the doubles rankings.

Shlomo made her debut for the Israel Fed Cup team in 2010 and has since made 11 appearances for her country in international competition.

ITF finals (12–27)

Singles (3–9)

Doubles (9–18)

Fed Cup participation

Singles

Doubles

See also
Jews in Sports#Tennis
List of Israelis

References

External links 

 
 
 

1988 births
Living people
Sportspeople from Tel Aviv
Israeli female tennis players
Israeli Jews